British Overseas Territories Citizens in the United Kingdom is a term referring to individuals who have migrated to the United Kingdom from a British overseas territory; it could also include UK-born people descended of these individuals. 

Despite being under the jurisdiction and sovereignty of the United Kingdom, British overseas territories are not part of the United Kingdom.  British Overseas Territories citizenship differs from British citizenship and does not automatically grant right of abode in the United Kingdom (except for Gibraltarians). All British Overseas Territories citizens (apart from those solely connected with the Sovereign Base Areas of Cyprus) were granted British citizenship on 21 May 2002, and hence should have right of abode in the UK. They can only exercise this full right of abode if entering the UK on a British Citizen passport or with a BOTC passport endorsed with a certificate of right of abode. A BOTC citizen travelling to the UK on a BOTC passport without a certificate of the right of abode is subject to immigration control. 

According to the 2001 UK Census 27,306 people born in the 14 British overseas territories were residing in either England, Scotland, Wales or Northern Ireland. The breakdown is as follows (the population columns do not count the same people, i.e. 9,000 people live in Montserrat whilst close to 8,000 Montserratian born people are residing in the UK, so before their migration the population of Montserrat would have been over 17,000):

See also
 British overseas territories
 British Overseas Territories citizen
 Foreign-born population of the United Kingdom
 Immigration to the United Kingdom since 1922

References

British overseas territories
Immigration to the United Kingdom by country of origin
Demographics of the United Kingdom